The 2015–16 Baylor Bears basketball team represented Baylor University in the 2015–16 NCAA Division I men's basketball season. This was head coach Scott Drew's thirteenth season at Baylor. The Bears competed in the Big 12 Conference and played their home games at the Ferrell Center. They finished the season 22–12, 10–8 in Big 12 play to finish in a tie for fifth place. They defeated Texas in the quarterfinal of the Big 12 tournament to advance to the semifinals where they lost to Kansas. They received an at-large bid to the NCAA tournament where they lost in the first round to Yale.

Previous season
The Bears finished the season 24–10, 11–7 in Big 12 play to finish in a tie for fourth place. They advanced to the semifinals of the Big 12 tournament where they lost to Kansas. They received an at-large bid to the NCAA tournament where they were upset in the second round by Georgia State.

Departures

Incoming transfers

Recruits

Recruiting class of 2016

Roster

Schedule and results

|-
!colspan=9 style="background:#004834; color:#FDBB2F;" | Regular season

|-
! colspan=9 style="background:#004834; color:#FDBB2F;" | Big 12 tournament

|-
!colspan=9 style="background:#004834; color:#FDBB2F;"| NCAA tournament

Rankings

*AP does not release post-NCAA tournament rankings

References

Baylor
Baylor Bears men's basketball seasons
Baylor